The 2008 Prince Edward Island Scotties Tournament of Hearts was held Jan. 18–22 in at the Charlottetown Curling Club in Charlottetown, Prince Edward Island. The winning team was Team Suzanne Gaudet who represented Prince Edward Island, finished with a 3–8 record at the 2008 Scotties Tournament of Hearts in Regina, Saskatchewan.

Teams

Draw 1
January 18, 3:00 PM AT

Draw 2
February 18, 8:10 PM AT

Draw 3
January 19, 2:00 PM AT

A Side Final
January 19, 7:00 PM AT

Draw 4
January 19, 7:00 PM AT

Draw 5
January 20, 2:00 PM AT

B Side Final
January 20, 7:00 PM AT

Draw 6
January 20, 7:00 PM AT

Draw 7
January 21, 3:00 PM AT

C Side Final
January 21, 8:00 PM AT

Final
February 18, Time TBA MT

References

Prince Edward Island Scotties Tournament Of Hearts, 2008
Prince Edward Island Scotties